Rutt's Hut is a restaurant in Clifton, New Jersey known for its deep-fried hot dogs.  In addition to the Ripper, customers can also order the dogs 'In-And-Out' style which is only in the hot oil briefly, and the 'Cremator' which is charred black.

The original roadside stand was opened in 1928 by Royal "Abe" Rutt and his wife, Anna. The family sold the restaurant to the current owners, George Petropoulakis, Louis Chrisafinis, Nicholas Karagiorgis, and George Sakellaris in late 1974. Today the building is split into three separate sections: a restaurant, a bar, and a take-out counter.

The restaurant has been named the #1 Hot Dog in the Nation by The Daily Meal multiple times.

References

External links 
 Official website

Restaurants in New Jersey
Companies based in Passaic County, New Jersey
Hot dog restaurants in the United States
Restaurants established in 1928
1928 establishments in New Jersey
Clifton, New Jersey